Traditional Asian medicine is a collective term for several types of traditional medicine practiced in Asia.

These include the medical traditions of:
 East Asia
 China
 Tibet
 Japan (Kampo)
 Korea
 Mongolia

 Southeast Asia
 Cambodia
 Indonesia (Jamu)
 Thailand
 Vietnam

 South Asia
 Ayurveda
 Tamil Nadu (Siddha)

 West Asia
 Middle East (Unani)
 Iran

See also
History of medicine in the Philippines
Pharmacognosy

References

Traditional medicine